Najeonchilgi refers to a particular kind of Korean handicraft where various colourful and vibrant pieces of shellfish are inlaid on certain objects

Etymology 
The very term 'Najeonchilgi' is a combination of two particular words: 'najeon'– mother-of-pearl and ‘chilgi’ which refers to lacquerware. ‘najeon’ refers to the composite material which forms the inner shiny shell layer. Korean craftsmen generally use the processed abalone shells. While in ancient China was where it originated primarily, throughout the years, it has gained popularity across Japan and South Korea.

History and transformation 
‘Najeonchilgi’ combines two China influenced craft procedures- the method of lacquering wood and the mother-of-pearl lacquerware. The Three Kingdom Period (57 B.C.-668 A.D.) witnessed the introduction of the first method and the second one was introduced during the Shilla Period (668 A.D.-935 A.D.). The Goryeo Dynasty (918-1392), considered the golden period of this craft, was influenced by Buddhism. During that period, the crafted products were mostly owned by the aristocrats, due to mostly their intricate, magnificent and eloquent designs as well as abstract, beautiful patterns. The foreign delegates and overseas kingdoms used to receive the products as precious gifts. The possible influence of Confucianism during the Joseon Dynasty (1392-1910) led to the inclusion of more simplistic nature-based designs. During the 16th century, the popularity of this craft further increased against the background of war-stricken Korea. The inclusion of scenes from daily lives of the commoners in addition to various plants, flowers or fruits managed to pique the interest of even the commoners. The time period between 1910 and 1945, Japan colonized Korea and obstructed the free prosperity of the trade. With Korea’s independence, the craft began to flourish again and during the economic boom in the 60s and 70s, it began to symbolize Korean wealth. While the supply of the abalone shells began to dry up due to heavy demand, turban and pearl shells were imported from places such as Australia, Taiwan and the Philippines. During the 1980s, however, the extortionate price shrunk the market to a great extent.

Process 
Magnificent skills, eye for detailed beauty and immense patience are the three most important qualities associated with the craftsmen of ‘Najeonchilgi’. The procedure includes more than thirty elaborate steps. Firstly, materials like wood, thick layers of glued paper, metal, porcelain are used to create a base. This method is followed by filling the gaps within the base with “saengot” or a fresh paint made from clay and the lacquer tree resin. After that, pieces of the mother-of-pearl get pasted on the base surface. Those pieces are cut in two ways which includes- “Jureumjil” or “filling” and “ggeuneumjil” or “cutting”. Finally, the entire piece gets polished, lacquered and smooth. During the modern days, the mass production as well as newer materials such as cashew lacquer instead of otchil, sometimes create hindrance in terms of durability and authenticity.

Usage 
There are many important usages of the "najeonchilgi" products. Initially the products were used as gifts to the foreign associates and the rulers. It is applied in the art of making furniture, decorative jewellery boxes, bookmarks, mirrors, combs, several accessories such as, earrings, bracelets, necklaces, brooches, hair accessories, water bottles, phone cases and so on. Earlier, when it used to be strictly associated with wealthy noble families, it was used to make stationary chests, smaller dining tables, hairdressing accessory chests, plates and bowls, trays and smaller wardrobes, etc.

Modern day master creators 
Kim Young-jun, a Najeonchilgi artist, is known to create beautiful “najeonchilgi” products with a certain twist to make them look fitted against the contemporary background. His exquisite skills and sense of aesthetics makes him choose every material carefully and provides a unique beauty to the object created. Some of the other finest master creators include Song Bang-woong, Sohn Dae-hyun, Jeung Myung-chae, Han Sang-soo, Kim Sun-kap, Lee Hyung-man, and Choi Jong-gwan.

Influence on the contemporary art 
Even though, the earlier finery and importance of “najeonchilgi” seem to fade to some extent during the modern days, with the advent of so many modern technologies of art and craft work, it is still very much an ongoing pride of the entire Korean culture and tradition. With the help of many art and handicraft exhibitions, fusion work involving diverse mediums but the same essence, Korean cultural organizations and their true admirers have been trying to preserve this tradition and attempting at retrieving its glorious past.

References 

Korean inventions
Artistic techniques
Korean art
Decorative arts